Kamalutdin Magomedrasulovich Akhmedov (born 14 April 1986) is a Russian former professional footballer.

Club career
He made his debut in the Russian Premier League in 2004 for FC Spartak Moscow. He played in 4 games in the UEFA Intertoto Cup 2004 for FC Spartak Moscow.

In July 2010 he was involved in a road accident, when the BMW car he was driving (allegedly without a valid driver license and under the influence of alcohol), collided with another car that was stopped at the red light. Four people in the other car were injured. He was arrested and charged with careless driving. His club FC Gazovik Orenburg issued a statement saying they will wait until all the legal issues are resolved before they make a decision about his contract.

References

1986 births
Footballers from Makhachkala
Living people
Russian footballers
Association football defenders
FC Spartak Moscow players
FC Khimki players
FC Fakel Voronezh players
FC Spartak Vladikavkaz players
Russian Premier League players
FC Orenburg players
FC Tyumen players